Joseph Zimba (born 1 August 1988) is a Zambian football defender who currently plays for Red Arrows F.C.

References

1988 births
Living people
Zambian footballers
Zambia international footballers
Red Arrows F.C. players
Association football defenders